Retiothrips is a genus of thrips in the family Phlaeothripidae.

Species
 Retiothrips bambusae

References

Phlaeothripidae
Thrips
Thrips genera